Thomas McCann is the name of:
 Thomas A. McCann, head football coach at Bowdoin College (1913–1914) and the University of Maine (1917)
 Tom McCann (1898–1975), head football coach at Tusculum College (1924) and the University of Miami (1931–1934)
 Thomas McCann, Scottish golfer, for whom the shoe brand Thom McAn is named